Mansfield Motor Speedway (formerly Mansfield Motorsports Park and Mansfield Motorsports Speedway) was a 0.44 mile dirt track located in Mansfield, Ohio, United States.

History

The former Mansfield Motorsports Park (known as Mansfield Motorsports Speedway prior to 2007) closed in 2010. With its moderately high banking and a wide racing surface, it was suitable for close racing and passing. The track hosted an ARCA RE/MAX Series race in 2009, and it also hosted the NASCAR Camping World Truck Series from 2004 to 2008. 

On January 18, 2013, Grant Milliron of Milliron Industries, a local facility specializing in waste, recycling and scrap metal, purchased the former Mansfield Motorsports Park for $800,000 in an auction held by the Richland County Sheriff's office following the property's seizure by the county in lieu of unpaid property taxes.

For 2017, it was announced that the track would undergo a transition from asphalt to dirt. The track had previously been dirt until 1999. The track name was also changed from "Spitzer Motor Speedway" to "Mansfield Motor Speedway" for 2017.

With the new dirt surface, Mansfield Motor Speedway hosted series like the Lucas Oil Late Model Dirt Series and the Arctic Cat All Star Circuit of Champions.

The track closed following the 2019 Dirt Million event.  Demolition of the grandstands began in late 2020 as portions were donated to a local high school.  The track walls were torn down in 2022 and portions of the fencing and SAFER barriers were sold to the Nelson’s Ledges Race Course.

Former events
Mansfield formerly hosted a wide variety of events, most notably the NASCAR Camping World Truck Series (formerly Craftsman Truck Series), which raced at Mansfield on Memorial Day weekend beginning in 2004.  Mansfield was the shortest track on the Camping World Truck Series schedule and was the only track in the United States to be on the Camping World Truck Series schedule as well as being Dodge Weekly Series sanctioned.  This ended in 2007 when the weekly race program at the track was discontinued.

In addition, Mansfield hosted two annual rounds of the USAR Hooters Pro Cup Series as well as the NASCAR Camping World East Series and Whelen Modified Tour, the ASA Late Model Series, ISMA and MSA supermodifieds and HOSS sprint cars.

The facility received a safety upgrade in 2006 when SAFER barriers were installed in the turns.

During early 2009, Music City Motorplex authorities announced a new promoter for the Nashville  speedway, who chose to remove all "upper level" touring series races (NASCAR and ARCA) and decided not to renew its NASCAR sanction.  Track officials were contacted by former Nashville promoter Joseph Mattioli III about having their major touring series races moved to Mansfield.  In February 2009, the track replaced Nashville on the ARCA RE/MAX Series tour, with the Tim Richmond Memorial ARCA Re/Max 200 scheduled to be held on June 20, 2009.

Drag strip
It was intended to have Mansfield replace Norwalk as the venue for the IHRA World Nationals by 2007 and to host a Live Nation IHRA eMax Nitro Jam event as part of the drag strip's opening festivities. The drag strip was never completed after construction was delayed and once started almost immediately halted.

Former NASCAR Races
 NASCAR Camping World Truck Series - Ohio 250 (2004-2008)

Track NASCAR Records
 NASCAR Craftsman Truck Series qualifying: Ron Hornaday Jr., 16.277 sec. (110.585 mph), 2005
 NASCAR Craftsman Truck Series race: Bobby Hamilton, 1 hr, 55 min, 37 sec (65.907 mph), 2005
 NASCAR Craftsman Truck Series race record for most caution flags: 18 (2006)

References

External links 
Mansfield Motor Speedway Official Site
Mansfield Motorsports Park Page on NASCAR.com
Mansfield Motor Speedway archive at Racing-Reference
Article about track's closing
Sheriffs Sale

NASCAR tracks
ARCA Menards Series tracks
Motorsport venues in Ohio
Buildings and structures in Mansfield, Ohio
Tourist attractions in Richland County, Ohio
NASCAR races at Mansfield Motorsports Park